Max Widmer (born 17 November 1933) is a Swiss former wrestler. He competed in the men's freestyle heavyweight at the 1960 Summer Olympics.

References

External links
 

1933 births
Living people
Swiss male sport wrestlers
Olympic wrestlers of Switzerland
Wrestlers at the 1960 Summer Olympics
People from Zofingen District
Sportspeople from Aargau